Fade into Me is the second single from American rock singer David Cook's second major label studio album, This Loud Morning. It was written by Cook along with Kevin Griffin, and Jamie Houston and produced by Matt Serletic.

Song Information
On October 6, 2011, David announced on his website than Fade into Me will be the second single from This Loud Morning.

Release
It was released on October 11, 2011 by RCA Records.

Video
In an interview published October 19, 2011, Cook discussed the planned video treatment for "Fade into Me," stating: "The content of the video, I wanted to showcase how we are live. I feel like it’s really easy sometimes to throw a tie on, and comb your hair, and put together this really sweet storyline; and I think “Fade into Me” could have definitely taken that angle and it would have worked. I wanted this video to be kind of a no frills, no pretense kind of look at us on the road. It’s a lot of live footage, really just for lack of a better way to phrase it, it’s more of a day in the life kind of thing.". The video (directed by Christopher Sims) debuted November 1, 2011 on VEVO.

Charts

References

External links 

2010s ballads
2011 songs
2011 singles
Songs written by Kevin Griffin
Song recordings produced by Matt Serletic
David Cook (singer) songs
Pop ballads
Rock ballads
RCA Records singles
Songs written by Jamie Houston (songwriter)
Songs written by David Cook (singer)